Nortt is an extreme metal project formed in 1995 by a Danish musician who goes by an eponymous pseudonym and describes his music as "Pure Depressive Black Funeral Doom Metal". In terms of lyrics and imagery (for instance the use of corpse paint) he is akin to other black metal acts, while the sound of his music is closer to doom metal.

On his official website Nortt reveals a fascination with darkness, night, nihilism, solitude, misery, misanthropy and death. In an interview he remarked: "Death ... is viewed as an inevitable and alluring phenomenon. Death is described from the perspective of the dying and from the dead. The uncertainty of death is preached as more thrilling than the well-known pain of life." He is a self-proclaimed nihilist, and thinks that religion is for the weak. He takes pride in being a strong individual and repeatedly degrades "weak" individuals. While he despises religion, he views the occult and old (pre-Christian, pagan) religions with respect. Nortt believes that it takes strength to be a Satanist, because of its existentialism and free thought.

For his third full-length album, Galgenfrist, he signed with Italian underground label Avantgarde Music.

Line-up 
 Nortt (real name unknown) – vocals, guitar, bass, drums, keyboards

Discography

Full-length albums 
 Gudsforladt ["Godforsaken"] (2004) (containing previously released tracks, as well as new material)
 Ligfærd ["Funeral March/Journey of the Dead"] (2006)
 Galgenfrist ["Last Respite"] (2008)
 Endeligt (2017)

EP releases 
 Hedengang ["The Passing"] (2002)

Demos 
 Nattetale (Rehearsal Version) (1997)
 Nattetale ["Night's Tale"] (1997)
 Døden... ["The Death…"] (1998)
 Graven ["The Grave"] (1999)

Split albums 
 Nortt / Xasthur (with Xasthur) (2004) (containing tracks from Hedengangen EP)

Compilation albums 
 Mournful Monuments 1998–2002 (2003)

Interviews 
 Interview (2004) on Antenna (in English)
 Interview (2004) on Black Alchemy (in Russian)
 Interview (2005) with Erin Fox on The Gauntlet (in English)
 Interview (2004) on Harm Magazine (in English)
 Interview (2004) with Paolo Vidmar on Metal Italia (in Italian)

References

External links 
 Nortt's official Instagram page

Danish black metal musical groups
Musical groups established in 1995
One-man bands
Funeral doom musical groups